Luca Gentili (born 22 May 1986) is an Italian footballer who plays for Serie D club Fossombrone.

Biography
Born in Fano, the second largest town (by population) in the Province of Pesaro and Urbino, Gentili started his career with Vis Pesaro. After a season with Perugia, he was loaned to Internazionale. He played once for Inter first team in a friendly match. However, Inter did not buy him and Gentili returned to Fano and played 2 Serie D seasons.

In August 2007, he signed a 1-year contract with, but now as a right back. He only managed to play for Ancona at 2007–08 Coppa Italia Serie C.

In January 2008, he was signed by Valle del Giovenco. After the club promoted to Lega Pro Prima Divisione, he was released.

In 2009–10 season, he played for Serie D side Real Montecchio and in next season left for Fossombrone after Montecchio relegated. Both clubs were located inside the Province of Pesaro and Urbino.

References

External links
 
 Luca Gentili at LaSerieD.com 

Italian footballers
A.C. Perugia Calcio players
Inter Milan players
Alma Juventus Fano 1906 players
A.C. Ancona players
Association football fullbacks
Sportspeople from the Province of Pesaro and Urbino
1986 births
Living people
Footballers from Marche
People from Fano